Ghaznawi is a toponymic surname (nisba) meaning from Ghazni (formerly Ghazna), a city in central Afghanistan. Notable people with the surname include:

 Abdul Halim Ghaznavi (1876-1953), politician in British India
 Abdul Karim Ghaznavi (1872–1939), politician in British India
 Abdullah Ghaznavi (1811–1881), Afghan-Indian Islamic scholar
 Ghulam Mohi-ud-Din Ghaznavi (1902-1975), Pakistani Sufi
 Hassan Ghaznavi, 12th-century Persian poet
 Ismail of Ghazni, emir of Ghazni
 Jamal al-Din al-Ghaznawi, Sunni Muslim scholar
 Kaif Ghaznavi, Pakistani actress
 Khatir Ghaznavi (1925–2008), Pakistani writer
 Mahmud of Ghazni (971–1030), founder of the Ghaznavid dynasty
 Mawdud of Ghazni (died 1050), Ghaznavid dynasty ruler
 Muhammad of Ghazni (died 1041), Ghaznavid dynasty ruler
 Rafiq Ghaznavi (1907–1974), musician in Indian films
 Shatir Ghaznavi (1905–1971), writer for Indian films

Toponymic surnames
Nisbas
Surnames of Afghan origin
People from Ghazni Province